Sakarya Büyükşehir Belediyesi Spor Kulübü, more commonly known as Sakarya BB was a Turkish professional basketball club based in Sakarya which played two seasons in the Turkish Basketball Super League (TBL). The team was founded and sponsored by Sakarya Metropolitan Municipality in 2013. Their home arena was Sakarya Sports Hall with a capacity of 5,000 seats.

In the 2016–17 season, Sakarya were promoted to the first tier Basketbol Süper Ligi for the first time in club history. In the 2017–18 season, they would make their European debut as they qualified for the Basketball Champions League qualification rounds. However, at the end of 2018–19 season, they finished in last place of the Basketbol Süper Ligi and were relegated to Turkish Basketball First League.

Arenas
Sakarya Atatürk Sports Hall (2013–2017)
Sakarya Sports Hall (2017–present)

Season by season

European record

Notable players

 Kerem Gönlüm
 Metecan Birsen
 Moustapha Fall
 Gian Clavell
  Toney Douglas
  C. J. Harris

Head coaches
 Okan Çevik (2015–2016)
 Selçuk Ernak (2016–present)

References

External links
Official website (in Turkish)

Basketball teams in Turkey
Basketball teams established in 2013
Sport in Adapazarı